Learning to Fly: Creating the Video and Concert, commonly referred to as Learning to Fly, is the third long-form video by American singer Hilary Duff. It was released on November 16, 2004, by Hollywood Records. The DVD takes a behind-the-scenes look at the making of Duff's "Fly" music video filmed at Worcester's Centrum Centre in Worcester, Massachusetts during rehearsal for her Most Wanted Tour. At the end of the DVD, the "Fly" music video is also featured. Prior to its DVD release in November, the production aired as a television special on Nickelodeon on September 26, 2004, in promotion of Duff's self-titled album released two days later in the United States.

Track listing

Charts

Certifications

Release history

References 

Learning to Fly
Documentary films about pop music and musicians
2004 video albums
Hollywood Records video albums